Wheeo is a locality in the Southern Tablelands region of New South Wales, Australia.

References

External links

Upper Lachlan Shire
Towns in New South Wales
Southern Tablelands